The 1993 Armenian Cup was the second edition of the Armenian Cup, a football competition. In 1993, the tournament had 31 participant, of which only one was a reserve team.

Results

First round

Banants Kotayk received a bye to the second round.

The matches were played on 27 and 29 March 1993.

|}

Second round

The matches were played on 2 and 3 April 1993.

|}

Quarter-finals

The first legs were played on 6 April 1993. The second legs were played on 21 April 1993.

|}

Semi-finals

The first legs were played on 30 April 1993. The second legs were played on 14 and 15 May 1993.

|}

Final

See also
 1993 Armenian Premier League

External links
 1993 Armenian Cup at rsssf.com

Armenian Cup seasons
Armenia
Armenian Cup, 1993